David Michael Matranga (born January 8, 1977) is an American former professional baseball infielder. He played parts of two seasons in Major League Baseball (MLB) for the Houston Astros in 2003 and Los Angeles Angels of Anaheim in 2005.

Career
Matranga played for the Texas Rangers Triple-A affiliate, the Oklahoma Redhawks, in 2007. In January 2008, Matranga signed a minor league contract with the Kansas City Royals. He became a free agent at the end of the season and signed a minor league contract with the Florida Marlins in February 2009. After playing the entire season for their top farm team, the New Orleans Zephyrs, he became a free agent once again.

Matranga was the 86th player in major league history and the second player in Astros history to hit a home run in his first plate appearance, doing so on June 27, 2003. Pinch-hitting in the ninth spot, Matranga batted in the fifth inning against Joaquin Benoit, which tied the game 4-4, although the Rangers would rally to win 10-7.

As it turned out, it was his only major league hit, as he failed to get a hit in his next five plate appearances in MLB, with his final appearance being the lone one with the Angels in 2005. After being released by the team on July 9, 2005, he signed as a free agent with four teams over the next four years, although he never made it back to the big leagues. 

After retiring at 32, Matranga became a sports agent, becoming Director of Scouting at PSI Sports Management.

See also
List of Major League Baseball players with a home run in their first major league at bat

References

External links

MiLB.com Player Page

1977 births
Living people
Major League Baseball second basemen
Houston Astros players
Los Angeles Angels players
Auburn Doubledays players
Round Rock Express players
New Orleans Zephyrs players
Arizona League Angels players
Arkansas Travelers players
Salt Lake Stingers players
Portland Beavers players
Oklahoma RedHawks players
Omaha Royals players
Baseball players from California
Pepperdine Waves baseball players